Sir Bertram Fox Hayes  DSO RD RNR (25 April 1864 – 15 May 1941) was a sea captain with the White Star Line.

Life and career 

Bertram Hayes was born in Birkenhead in Cheshire, but his family moved to Goole in Yorkshire when he was four years of age. He began his service in the Merchant Navy as a Junior Clerk at the age of 14 in the Goole Shipping Company. He went to sea in 1880 and gained his Master's Certificate in 1889 and his Extra Master's in 1897. In 1898 he joined the firm of Ismay, Imrie & Company (parent company of the White Star Line), sailing as Mate aboard the Coptic. He was promoted to Master and commanded the SS Britannic, and during the Boer War he took troops to South Africa, carrying 37,000 troops in three years, for which he was awarded the Transport Medal.

He also served on the White Star Line ships Teutonic, Germanic, Suevic, Arabic, the Laurentic, in which he inaugurated the company's Canadian service in 1909, and the Adriatic.

Hayes was called as a witness to the British Board of Trade inquiry held after the Titanic disaster, which he attended on 11 June 1912. In his testimony, Hayes was questioned mainly on the subject on routines regarding spotting ice. Hayes described the circumstances on the night of the sinking of the Titanic as "abnormal, which nobody had experienced before".

During the First World War he was appointed Captain of the RMS Olympic when the ship was employed as a troop carrier across the Atlantic and the Mediterranean. In 1917 he was awarded a CMG for his services. On 12 May 1918, en route from New York to Southampton and while in the English Channel, the Olympic, sighted the U-boat SM U-103. After opening fire, the Olympic turned to ram and sank the submarine. For this service, he was awarded the DSO.

He was knighted in 1919 for "valuable services in connection with the transport of troops". Between 1922 and 1924 he captained the RMS Majestic, which was then the world's largest ship, and retired as Commodore of the White Star Line in 1924 when the company reinstated the rank.

In 1925 he published his memoirs, Hull Down, Reminisces of Windjammers, Troops and Travellers, in the book Fox-Hayes makes no mention of the ill-fated RMS Titanic even though he was with the White Star Line at the time of the sinking.

He remained a bachelor and died on 15 May 1941 at his home in Liverpool.

References

www.angloboerwar.com
News from 1924/1941: Retirement/Death of Commodore Hayes - www.encyclopedia-titanica.org

External links
Photograph of Sir Bertram Fox Hayes from the National Portrait Gallery.

1864 births
1941 deaths
People from Birkenhead
English sailors
Steamship captains
White Star Line
Royal Naval Reserve personnel